Leslie Samuels (8 December 1928 – 3 May 1998) was an English footballer, who played as an inside forward.

Samuels started his career with Burnley where he made just two league starts before he added another 12 at Exeter City scoring his first league goal. He moved to Wrexham and Crewe Alexandra before he moved to Bradford City in December 1955. It was at Bradford where he spent the longest part of his career, making 84 appearances and scoring 38 goals. In his second season at City he was the club's top goal-scorer when he scored 19 goals from 43 games. He was on course to repeat the feat the following season until he left for Stockport County.

References

1928 births
People from Oldham
1998 deaths
English footballers
Footballers from Oldham
English Football League players
Burnley F.C. players
Exeter City F.C. players
Wrexham A.F.C. players
Crewe Alexandra F.C. players
Bradford City A.F.C. players
Stockport County F.C. players
Association football inside forwards